Bulgogi (불고기;  ;  from Korean bul-gogi ), literally "fire meat", is a gui (구이; Korean-style grilled or roasted dish) made of thin, marinated slices of meat, most commonly beef, grilled on a barbecue or on a stove-top griddle. It is also often stir-fried in a pan in home cooking. Sirloin, rib eye or brisket are frequently used cuts of beef for the dish. The dish originated from northern areas of the Korean Peninsula, but is a very popular dish in South Korea, where it can be found anywhere from upscale restaurants to local supermarkets as pan-ready kits.

Etymology 
Bulgogi came from the Korean word bul-gogi, consisting of bul ("fire") and gogi ("meat"). The compound word is derived from the Pyongan dialect, as the dish itself is a delicacy of Pyongan Province, North Korea. the dish became popular in Seoul and other parts of South Korea, introduced by refugees from Pyongan. It was then listed in the 1947 edition of the Dictionary of the Korean Language, as meat grilled directly over a charcoal fire.

In the Standard Korean Language Dictionary published by the National Institute of Korean Language, the word is listed as meat such as beef that is thinly sliced, marinated, and grilled over the fire. The word is also included in English-language dictionaries such as Merriam-Webster Dictionary and Oxford Dictionary of English. Merriam-Webster dated the word's appearance in the American English lexicon at 1961.

History 
Bulgogi is believed to have originated during the Goguryeo (고구려) era (37 BCE–668 CE), when it was originally called maekjeok, with the beef being grilled on a skewer. It was called neobiani (너비아니), meaning "thinly spread" meat, during the Joseon Dynasty and was traditionally prepared especially for the wealthy and the nobility. In the medieval Korean history book Dongguksesi (동국세시), bulgogi is recorded under the name yeomjeok (염적), which means "fire meat." It was grilled barbecue-style on a hwaro grill on skewers, in pieces approximately 0.5 cm thick. Although it is no longer cooked skewered, this original type of bulgogi is today called bulgogi sanjeok (불고기 산적).

Preparation and serving 

Bulgogi is made from thin slices of sirloin or other prime cuts of beef. Ribeye is also commonly used due to its tenderness and easily cuttable texture. In addition to beef, chicken and pork bulgogi are also common ingredients used to prepare the dish. Pork belly, or samgyeopsal in Korean, is a popular cut for pork bulgogi. Much like the ribeye, it is tender and fatty which can give the meat a better taste. Before cooking, the meat is marinated to enhance its flavor and tenderness with a mixture of soy sauce, sugar, sesame oil, garlic, ground black pepper, and other ingredients such as scallions, ginger, onions or mushrooms, especially white button mushrooms or matsutake. In most cases when cooking Bulgogi, these are common ingredients. However, the ingredients used to marinate the meat can vary from chef to chef and even from family to family depending on one's preferences and traditions. Pureed pears, pineapple, kiwi,  and onions are often used as tenderizers. Sugar or other types of sweeteners such as corn syrup may sometimes also be used to add a sweeter taste. The length of time in which the meat is left to marinate also varies depending on preferences. Generally, bulgogi meat is left to marinate for less than an hour but many top chefs will even leave it overnight for the best taste.  Sometimes, cellophane noodles are added to the dish, which varies by the region and specific recipe.

The most common way of preparing beef bulgogi produces a dark looking texture that is well seasoned and flavored. Spicy variations are also common where a spicy paste such as gochujang, made from chili powder, rice, fermented soybeans, barley, and salt, is added to the marinade to make the meat spicy. This is most commonly done with the pork variations.

Bulgogi is traditionally grilled, but pan-cooking has become popular as well. Whole cloves of garlic, sliced onions and chopped green peppers are often grilled or fried with the meat. Bulgogi is often served over or with a side of rice and accompanied by various side dishes such as egg soup and kimchi (fermented cabbage). This dish is sometimes served with a side of lettuce or other leafy vegetable, which is used to wrap a slice of cooked meat, often along with a dab of ssamjang, rice, or other side dishes, and then eaten together.

In many Korean barbecue restaurants, customers are seated at a table that will have a grill installed in the middle. Raw and marinated bulgogi is one of many popular types that customers can order and cook themselves right on the table. It is common for each person to pick at the meat directly from the grill or serve each other when eating. Bulgogi is eaten any time of the year however, it is common for people in Korea to enjoy grilling the marinated meat on special occasions or in social settings.

In popular culture 
Bulgogi is served in barbecue restaurants in Korea, and there are bulgogi-flavoured fast-food hamburgers sold at many South Korean fast-food restaurants. The hamburger patty is marinated in bulgogi sauce and served with lettuce, tomato, onion, and sometimes cheese.

Variations 
 Kongnamul-bulgogi
 Osam-bulgogi

See also 
 Galbi
 Korean barbecue
 Korean royal court cuisine
 List of beef dishes

References

External links 

 
 
 

Barbecue
Korean beef dishes
Korean pork dishes